Polonia is an unincorporated census-designated place in the town of Sharon, Portage County, Wisconsin, United States. It is located on Wisconsin Highway 66 two miles east of Ellis and about 8 miles southwest of Rosholt.

References

Census-designated places in Portage County, Wisconsin
Census-designated places in Wisconsin
Polish-American culture in Wisconsin